Bill Brewster is a British writer and disc jockey. Brewster co-wrote the book Last Night a DJ Saved My Life with Frank Broughton. The duo also launched and run Djhistory.com. In 2002, his mix album, Praxis, was released on Hooj Choons.

Brewster was born in Grimsby, and later edited Mixmag USA.

Sometime musician and songwriter, Brewster appeared with Group Therapy (Kamera Records: "Arty Fact"), Expanding Wallets and The Andertons.

He has also curated the After Dark spinoff series for Late Night Tales, including After Dark, After Dark: Nightshift, and After Dark: Nocturne.

References

External links

Living people
People from Grimsby
British songwriters
British music journalists
British DJs
Year of birth missing (living people)